Alladurg or Allahdurg is a village in Medak district, Telangana, India.

Geography
It has an average elevation of 511 metres (1679 ft).

References

Villages in Medak district
Mandal headquarters in Medak district